Kan Mi-youn (born February 2, 1982) is a South Korean singer, actress, radio host, model, fashion designer, and businesswoman. Kan joined the South Korean girl group Baby V.O.X. in October 1997, which went on to become one of the most popular girl groups of that time. Kan went on to become a solo artist after the group disbanded in February 2006.

Career

1997–2006: Baby V.O.X

Kan Mi-youn debuted in October 1997 as a new member of the first generation girl group Baby V.O.X, replacing ex-member Cha Yu-Mi, who was injured on stage during a performance.   Kan was given the title of 'princess' by her fellow members and fans, and was known for her cute and comical traits.  Kan was considered the main, and best, vocalist of the group, due to her ability to hit high notes.

Following the release of Baby V.O.X's third studio album, Come Come Come Baby, the lead single, Get Up, reached number one on Korea's pop charts, securing their spot as one of Korea's top pop music groups.  The group gained a vast loyal fan base in Korea, China, Thailand and other Asian markets.

Despite garnering a large fan base, Kan was a frequent target of anti-fans.  The most shocking incident was in 1999, when Kan was targeted for murder by a fan of the Korean boy group H.O.T.  Kan was rumored to be dating H.O.T member Moon Hee Joon, which attracted many anti-fans and negative press.  She received an envelope containing razor blades and a letter threatening to murder her.

2006: Solo career
In 2006, Kan made the decision to pursue a solo career and signed with H2 Entertainment, thus ending her eight years of activities as a member of Baby V.O.X. Following her departure, Baby V.O.X released one final album and disbanded.

On September 15, 2006, Kan released her first solo album, Refreshing. The album was a reflection on her personal life and maturing as a woman.

Following the release of her album, and after learning how to fluently speak in Mandarin, Kan made the decision to break into the Chinese music market.

2007–2009: Chinese market
While focusing on the Chinese market, Kan managed to reach a significant level of success.  One of Kan's most notable feats was winning a famous Mandarin singing competition, 名声大震, with Chinese singer Anson Hu.  It was this show that shot her into stardom, securing her as a successful artist in the Chinese music market.

In January 2008, Kan released a Chinese version of her debut Korean album, Refreshing.

Following the Sichuan earthquake in China, Kan collaborated with various Asian artists to release "Promise" and "I Love Asia" for a fund raising project that supported the victims of the earthquake.

In 2009, Kan left H2 Entertainment and moved to the then-newly launched Source Music label, founded by her then-manager So Sung-jin.

2010: Return to Korea
On July 1, 2010, Kan Mi-youn made her comeback in South Korea after a three-year absence.  Despite her hiatus, Kan proved that she was still hot in the Korean industry.  With her new short hair and sexy image, Kan released her first digital single, Going Crazy (ft. Mir of MBLAQ).   The music video, which featured Lee Joon and Mir of MBLAQ, recorded over 200,000 views in under an hour on GomTV.

The song proved to be quite successful, and managed to peak at #11 on Korea's top music chart, Gaon.

On July 15, 2010, Kan officially launched her own fashion line named Kanderella.  The line was eventually sold on exclusive websites and was reported to be in high demand.

2011: WATCH and OBSESSION
On February 8, 2011, Kan released a music video teaser for Sunshine (ft. Junsu), a pre-release single for her upcoming album. The full-length music video and song were released the following day.

On February 14, 2011, a music video teaser for her lead single, Paparazzi, was released. Two days later, the full-length music video of Paparazzi, (starring Kim Hyung-jun of SS501), was released. The full-length mini-album, WATCH, was digitally and physically released the following day. Promotions for Paparazzi began on February 18, 2011, on M! Countdown. The song experienced much attention and even placed Kan in the top spots on music stations, as well as digital music charts.

On September 26, 2011, a music video teaser for Kan's new song, Won't Meet You, was released. Two days later, the full-length music video to Won't Meet You, as well as her second mini-album, OBSESSION, were released. Promotions for Won't Meet You began on September 29, 2011, on M! Countdown.

On October 24, 2011, Kan took over from Noh Hong-chul as DJ for MBC FM4U's Close Friends radio program. The program invites popular Korean singers to showcase their talents and interact with fans.  Kan celebrated her 300-day anniversary in August 2012 and reported the program's ratings were higher than ever. Kan ended her position and handed over the baton to UV's Muzie on October 22, 2012. The show has since been canceled and replaced by FM Date.

2014—present
In May 2014, Kan signed a contract with Mako Amusement to further both her musical and acting career. She joined her fellow ex-Baby V.O.X member Shim Eun-jin who is also signed with Mako.

Discography

Studio albums

Extended plays

Singles

Promotional singles

Videography

Music videos

Filmography

Film

Television series

Variety shows

Awards
All awards listed below are referenced from Source Music & Naver

References

External links
 
 

1982 births
Living people
South Korean women pop singers
South Korean female idols
South Korean television actresses
South Korean film actresses
21st-century South Korean singers
21st-century South Korean women singers